Phintia broweri is a moth of the  family Notodontidae. It is found in South America, including Peru and Bolivia.

External links
Species page at Tree of Life project

Notodontidae of South America
Moths described in 2009